Zophodia brevistrigella is a species of snout moth in the genus Zophodia found in Brazil. It was described by Émile Louis Ragonot in 1888.

References

Moths described in 1888
Phycitini